The Annville-Cleona School District is a small, public school district in Lebanon County, Pennsylvania. It covers the Borough of Cleona and Annville Township, North Annville Township and South Annville Township in Lebanon County, Pennsylvania. According to 2002 local census data, it serves a resident population of 11,876. In 2009, the district residents’ per capita income was $19,519, while the median family income was $36,276. In the Commonwealth, the median family income was $52,381 and the United States median family income was $49,445, in 2010. It is a relatively small school.

The district operates Annville-Cleona High School (7th-12th grades), Annville Elementary (3rd-6th grades), and Cleona Elementary (Kindergarten-2nd grades).

References

School districts in Lebanon County, Pennsylvania